Marivana Oliveira is a Brazilian Paralympic athlete with cerebral palsy. She won the silver medal in the women's shot put F35 event at the 2020 Summer Paralympics held in Tokyo, Japan. She also represented Brazil at the 2012 Summer Paralympics held in London, United Kingdom and at the 2016 Summer Paralympics held in Rio de Janeiro, Brazil. She won the bronze medal in the women's shot put F35 event in 2016.

She won the bronze medal in the women's shot put F35 event at the World Para Athletics Championships both in 2015 and in 2019.

References

External links 
 

Living people
Year of birth missing (living people)
Place of birth missing (living people)
Brazilian female discus throwers
Brazilian female shot putters
Track and field athletes with cerebral palsy
Paralympic athletes of Brazil
Paralympic silver medalists for Brazil
Paralympic bronze medalists for Brazil
Paralympic medalists in athletics (track and field)
Athletes (track and field) at the 2012 Summer Paralympics
Athletes (track and field) at the 2016 Summer Paralympics
Athletes (track and field) at the 2020 Summer Paralympics
Medalists at the 2016 Summer Paralympics
Medalists at the 2020 Summer Paralympics
Medalists at the 2011 Parapan American Games
Medalists at the 2015 Parapan American Games
Medalists at the 2019 Parapan American Games
21st-century Brazilian women